Jean Penzer (born 1 October 1927) was a French cinematographer. He contributed to more than sixty films from 1951 to 1992.

Awards 
 1986 César Award for best Cinematography for He Died with His Eyes Open

References

External links
 

1927 births
2021 deaths
People from Livry-Gargan
French cinematographers
César Award winners